Roger Ground is a hamlet just south of the village of Hawkshead, in the South Lakeland district, in the English county of Cumbria.

References 
 Philip's Street Atlas Cumbria (page 179)

Hamlets in Cumbria
Hawkshead